Boycotts of Israel are the refusal and incitement to refusal to have commercial or social dealings with Israel in order to inflict economic hardship upon the state. The objective of boycotts of Israel is to influence Israel's practices and policies by means of using economic weapons as the coercive force. The specific objective of Israel boycotts varies; the BDS movement calls for boycotts of Israel "until it meets its obligations under international law, and the purpose of the Arab League's boycott of Israel was to prevent Arab states and others to contribute to Israel's economy. Israel believes that boycotts against it are antisemitic.

Boycotts of Jewish-owned businesses in Mandatory Palestine
Boycotts of Jewish-owned businesses in Mandatory Palestine were organised by Arab leaders starting in 1922 in an attempt to damage the Jewish population of Palestine economically, especially during periods of communal strife between Jews and Arabs. The original boycott forswore with any Jewish-owned business operating in Mandatory Palestine. Palestinian Arabs "who were found to have broken the boycott ... were physically attacked by their brethren and their merchandise damaged" when Palestinian Arabs rioted in Jerusalem in 1929. Another, stricter boycott was imposed on Jewish businesses in following the riots that called on all of the Arabs in the region to abide by its terms. The Arab Executive Committee of the Syrian-Palestinian Congress called for a boycott of Jewish businesses in 1933 and in 1934, the Arab Labor Federation conducted a boycott as well as an organized picketing of Jewish businesses. In 1936, the Palestinian Arab leadership called on another boycott and threatened those who did not respect the boycott with violence, however, this boycott was unsuccessful as Jewish lawyers, physicians, and hospitals were too heavily integrated into Palestinian society.

Arab League boycott of Israel

Economic
The Arab League organised a boycott of pre-establishment Israel in December 1945, shortly after its formation, before the establishment of the State of Israel in 1948, and continued and intensified it afterwards. The Arab League boycott is an effort by its member states to isolate Israel economically to prevent Arab states and discourage non-Arabs from providing support to Israel and adding to Israel's economic and military strength.

As part of the Arab boycott, for example, existing road and rail links with neighboring Arab countries were severed, all direct air flights were not permitted, overflights over Arab airspace by Israeli aircraft and of third country airlines that fly into Israel was refused, and even airlines that flew to Israel were refused entry to Arab countries. Originally, the Arab boycott had a moderate negative impact on Israel's economy and development. Inevitably the economies of participating Arab nations also suffered as the result of a deterioration in the foreign direct investment climate in the Arab world, and reduction in the volume of trade. Whether or not the Arab nations in question were aware of the potential risks to their own economies is still unknown. There is still debate as to whether they, in unison, viewed the economic sanctions as a necessary sacrifice to slow the development of the newly declared Israeli state.

The Organisation of Islamic Cooperation (OIC) urges its members to join in the Arab League boycott of Israel. Ten members of OIC (in addition to those that are also members of the Arab League) have joined the diplomatic boycott: Afghanistan, Bangladesh, Brunei, Chad, Indonesia, Iran, Malaysia, Mali, Niger, and Pakistan. The call was renewed on 22 May 2018, when the OIC recommended to its 57 members a selective ban on some Israeli goods because of the events in Gaza and the opening of the United States embassy in Jerusalem.

Egypt (1979), the Palestinian Authority (1993), and Jordan (1994) signed peace treaties or agreements that ended their participation in the boycott of Israel. Mauritania, which never applied the boycott, established diplomatic relations with Israel in 1999. Algeria, Morocco, and Tunisia do not enforce the boycott.

In 1994, following the Oslo Peace Accords, the Cooperation Council for the Arab States of the Gulf (GCC) states, ended their participation in the Arab boycott against Israel, and stated that total elimination of the boycott is a necessary step for peace and economic development in the region. In present days, the Arab boycott is rarely applied. The move prompted a surge of investment in Israel, and resulted in the initiation of joint cooperation projects between Israel and Arab countries.

Today, most Arab states, Syria being the exception, no longer attempt to enforce the secondary or tertiary boycotts. Syria, Lebanon, and Iran (though not an Arab state) are the only states which actively enforce the primary boycott. The Arab League's Central Boycott Office has become obsolete. With the vast majority of Arab states benefiting from trade with Israel, any "boycott" has become symbolic in nature, limited to bureaucratic slights such as diplomatic ostracism and passport restrictions.

There are still residual laws banning relations with Israel. For example, Sudan has since 1958 had a law that forbids establishing relations with Israel, and outlaws business with citizens of Israel as well as business relationships with Israeli companies or companies with Israeli interests. The law also forbids the direct or indirect import of any Israeli goods.

Diplomatic

Member states of the United Nations were formed into Regional Groups in 1961 to act as voting blocs and negotiation forums. On a purely geographic basis, Israel should be a member of the Asia-Pacific Group but Arab and Muslim nations have blocked Israel from joining. Israel was blocked from the regional group system for 39 years, which besides other consequences prevented it from participating on any UN body. In 2000, to by-pass the ban, Israel was admitted as a temporary member of Western European and Others Group, subject to annual renewal, but only in WEOG's headquarters in the US, which enabled it to put forward candidates for election to various UN General Assembly bodies. In 2004, Israel's membership of the WEOG became permanent, but only in WEOG's headquarters in New York, while remaining an observer at the other UN offices. Only in December 2013 was Israel granted full membership of the WEOG in Geneva, entitling Israel to participate in Geneva-based U.N. bodies, such as the UN Human Rights Council.

Other countries which do not recognise Israel are  Cuba and North Korea.

When Egypt entered into a peace treaty with Israel in 1979, its membership of the Arab League was suspended until 1989.  In 2002, the Arab League offered recognition of Israel by Arab countries as part of the resolution of the Palestinian–Israeli conflict in the Arab Peace Initiative.

Sixteen Arab and OIC countries do not accept Israeli passports.  These are Algeria, Bangladesh, Brunei, Iran, Iraq, Kuwait, Lebanon, Libya, Malaysia, Oman, Pakistan, Saudi Arabia, Sudan, Syria, United Arab Emirates and Yemen. Eight of these also do not accept passports of other countries whose holder has an Israeli visa endorsed in it.

The bans may also apply to state-owned enterprises, such as airlines. Twenty-two countries ban direct flights and overflights to and from Israel. These are Afghanistan, Algeria, Bahrain, Bangladesh, Brunei, Iran, Iraq, Kuwait, Lebanon, Libya, Malaysia, Morocco, Oman, Pakistan, Qatar, Saudi Arabia, Somalia, Sudan, Syria, Tunisia, UAE, Yemen. There was an exception in May 2020 when a flight brought Covid medical supplies for the Palestinians. However, the Palestinian Authority controversially rejected the supplies.

Sports

In October 2017, when an Israeli won gold in an international judo championship in Abu Dhabi, the United Arab Emirates, officials refused to fly the Israeli flag and play the Israeli national anthem, instead playing the official music of the International Judo Federation (IJF) and flying the IJF's logo, while the gold winner, Tal Flicker, sang the "Hatikvah", Israel's national anthem. The UAE also banned Israeli athletes from wearing their country's symbols on uniforms, having to wear IJF uniforms. Other contestants received similar treatment. In December 2017, seven Israelis were denied visas by Saudi Arabia to compete in an international chess tournament. On 24 May 2018, a team of international jurists, including Harvard Professor Alan Dershowitz, announced a plan to petition the international Court of Arbitration for Sport against the exclusion of Israel's flag and anthem at sporting events in Arab countries. In July 2018, the International Judo Federation cancelled two grand slam judo events in Tunis and Abu Dhabi because Israeli flags were not allowed to be raised. Also in July 2018, the World Chess Federation said it will ban Tunisia from hosting the international chess competition in 2019 if it does not grant a visa to Israeli contestants, including a seven-year-old Israeli girl champion.

In addition, sports teams from various Arab states continue to boycott Israeli athletes at international matches. When they are drawn against an Israeli team, some teams choose instead to forfeit the match.

Arms embargoes
Just before the outbreak of the Six-Day War in 1967, France – then Israel's main arms supplier, especially of aircraft – imposed an arms embargo on Israel, including on spare parts for its aircraft.

In 2014, during the Gaza war, Spain froze arms and military technology exports to Israel. The embargo also applied to dual-use materiel. Also at the same time, British government ministers said no new arms export licenses would be granted for sales to Israel until a formal peace is agreed. In case hostilities are to flare up, exports under existing licenses would reportedly be discontinued.

On 23 March 2018, the United Nations Human Rights Council called on the international community to halt arms sales to Israel. Amnesty International has repeatedly called for an arms embargo on Israel, most recently on 29 April 2018 following clashes between the IDF and protesters at the Gaza Strip security fence as part of the "Great March of Return" protests.

Boycott, Divestment and Sanctions campaign

In 2005 over 170 Palestinian civil society organizations launched the Boycott, Divestment and Sanctions (BDS) movement. The goal of BDS is to subject Israel to boycott, divestment and sanctions until it withdraws from the occupied territories, removes the separation barrier in the West Bank, ensures full equality for Arab-Palestinian citizens of Israel, and grants the right of return of Palestinian refugees. BDS is modeled after the anti-apartheid movement in South Africa. Its proponents compare the plight of the Palestinians with that of the black South Africans.

A large number of activist groups around the world have heeded BDS' call and are advocating for boycotts of Israel.

In July 2021, the Palestinian Authority arrested a singer who performed in a settlement in the West Bank, though the performance was for Palestinian workers only.

Academic and cultural boycotts

A campaign for an academic boycott of Israel was launched in April 2004 by a group of Palestinian academics and intellectuals in Ramallah, in the West Bank, that formed the Palestinian Campaign for the Academic and Cultural Boycott of Israel (PACBI) as part of the Boycott, Divestment and Sanctions (BDS) campaign. The campaign calls for BDS activities against Israel to put international pressure on Israel, in this case against Israeli academic institutions, all of which are said by PACBI to be implicated in the perpetuation of Israeli occupation, in order to achieve BDS goals. Since then, proposals for academic boycotts of particular Israeli universities and academics have been made by academics and organizations in the Palestinian territories, the United States, the United Kingdom, and other countries. The goal of the proposed academic boycotts is to isolate Israel in order to force a change in Israel's policies towards the Palestinians, which proponents argue are discriminatory and oppressive, including oppressing the academic freedom of Palestinians.

In 2006, two of Britain's lecturers' unions, the National Association of Teachers in Further and Higher Education and the Association of University Teachers (AUT), voted to support an academic boycott against Israel. The AUT ban was overturned by members at an Emergency General Meeting a few weeks later, while the NATFHE boycott expired when a merger with AUT to form the University and College Union came into effect. In May 2007, the UCU congress passed Motion 30, which called on the members to circulate information and consider a boycott request by Palestinian trade unions (it quickly reversed its position once the UCU received legal advice that the boycott was illegal because it was racial discrimination).  That same year, nearly 300 university presidents across the United States signed a join statement denouncing the boycott movement. Following Operation Cast Lead in 2010, a group of 15 American university professors launched a campaign calling for an academic and cultural boycott of Israel. In 2010 the US Campaign for the Academic and Cultural Boycott of Israel (USACBI) announced it had collected 500 endorsements from US academics for an academic and cultural boycott of Israel. The endorsements were seen as a sign of changing US attitudes toward Israel in the wake of an Israeli raid on a humanitarian aid flotilla in the Mediterranean.

In 2009, Spanish organizers of an international solar power design competition excluded a team from the Israeli Ariel University Center. The stated reason was that the Ariel university is located in the West Bank, a Spanish official was quoted saying, "Spain acted in line with European Union policy of opposing Israel's occupation of Palestinian land." On that year, the Norwegian University of Science and Technology rejected the academic boycott of Israel, stating that being able to cooperate with Israeli academics, and hearing their views on the conflict, is critical for studying of the causes of the conflict between Israel and the Palestinians and how it can be resolved.

In 2011 the University of Johannesburg decided to suspend ties with Israeli Ben-Gurion University, citing the university's support for the Israeli military. The decision was seen to affect projects in biotechnology and water purification. However, two days later, Ihron Rensburg, vice chancellor and principal of the university issued a statement saying that "UJ is not part of an academic boycott of Israel... It has never been UJ's intention to sever all ties with BGU, although it may have been the intention of some UJ staff members."

University of Pennsylvania President Amy Gutmann said in January 2012 that the university "has clearly stated on numerous occasions that it does not support sanctions or boycotts against Israel". She said that the school was not a sponsor of a BDS conference taking place on campus in February 2012.

In May 2013, in what was seen as a major development, Stephen Hawking joined the academic boycott of Israel by reversing his decision to participate in the Jerusalem-based Israeli Presidential Conference hosted by Israeli president Shimon Peres. Hawking approved a published statement from the British Committee for the Universities of Palestine that described his decision as independent, "based upon his knowledge of Palestine, and on the unanimous advice of his own academic contacts there". Reactions to Hawking's boycott were mixed; some praised his boycott as a "peaceful protest", while others condemned his decision and accused him of anti-semitism.

On 4 December 2013, the American Studies Association (ASA) endorsed a boycott of Israeli academic institutions in a resolution that stated "there is no effective or substantive academic freedom for Palestinian students and scholars under conditions of Israeli occupation, and Israeli institutions of higher learning are a party to Israeli state policies that violate human rights and negatively impact the working conditions of Palestinian scholars and students." The election attracted the largest number of voters in the association history with 66.05% for, 30.5% against and 3.43% abstaining. Over 92 universities rejected the boycott and some of them withdrew their membership in the ASA in protest of the boycott decision.

In October 2014, 500 Middle East studies scholars and librarians issued a call for an academic boycott of Israel. According to the signatories, "world governments and mainstream media do not hold Israel accountable for its violations of international law. We, however, as a community of scholars engaged with the Middle East, have a moral responsibility to do so." Also in October 2014, 500 anthropologists endorsed an academic boycott of Israeli institutions seen as complicit in violations of Palestinians' rights. The signatories of the statement said, "as a community of scholars who study problems of power, oppression, and cultural hegemony, we have a moral responsibility to speak out and demand accountability from Israel and our own governments."

In January 2016, 168 Italian academics and researchers published a call to boycott Israeli academic institutions. Israel's Institute of Technology, Technion, was singled out as a boycott target. "The Institute carries out research in a wide range of technologies and weapons used to oppress and attack Palestinians", said the call.

Reception

Support

In 2003, Archbishop Desmond Tutu has called on the international community to treat Israel as it treated apartheid South Africa and supports the divestment campaign against Israel.

In February 2004 following a six-month inquiry a select committee presented a report to the British parliament calling for the suspension of the European Union's preferential trade agreement with Israel "until it (Israel) lifts the movement restrictions which it has placed on Palestinian trade". Between 2002 and 2004 the EU exported £30.1 billion worth of goods to Israel while the value of goods imported was £21.1 billion The European Union has expressed opposition to boycotting Israel, while maintaining that it is legal for Europeans to boycott Israel.

A joint open letter by 322 UK academics was published in The Guardian 16 January 2009. The letter called on the British government and the British people to take all feasible steps to oblige Israel to stop its "military aggression and colonial occupation" of the Palestinian land and its "criminal use of force", suggesting to start with a programme of boycott, divestment and sanctions.

In 2008 British Member of Parliament Sir Gerald Kaufman claimed, "It is time for our government to make clear to the Israeli government that its conduct and policies are unacceptable and to impose a total arms ban on Israel."

In November 2012 a group of 51 people, including Nobel peace laureates, prominent artists and activists published a letter calling for a military embargo on Israel. The letter accused several countries of providing assistance to Israel that facilitated Israel's 2012 military operation in the Gaza Strip. Nobel peace laureate Mairead Maguire was among the group signing the letter.

Opposition
The Anti-Defamation League, whose mission is to stop the defamation of Jews, has claimed that singling out Israel is "outrageous and biased" as well as "deplorable and offensive", and heads of several major U.S. Jewish organizations have referred to them as "lop-sided" and "unbalanced".

Boycott calls have also been called "profoundly unjust" and relying on a "false" analogy with the previous apartheid regime of South Africa. One critical statement has alleged that the boycotters apply "different standards" to Israel than other countries, that the boycott is "counterproductive and retrograde" yet has no comparability to Nazi boycotts of Jewish shops in the 1930s.

The Economist contends that the boycott is "flimsy" and ineffective, that "blaming Israel alone for the impasse in the occupied territories will continue to strike many outsiders as unfair," and points out that the Palestinian leadership does not support the boycott.

In an op-ed published in The Jerusalem Post in November 2010, Gerald Steinberg and Jason Edelstein contend that while "the need to refute their [BDS organizations] allegations is clear, students and community groups must also adopt a proactive strategy to undermine the credibility and influence of these groups. This strategy will marginalize many of the BDS movement's central actors, and expose the lie that BDS is a grassroots protest against Israeli policy. Exposing their abuses and funding sources, and forcing their campaign leaders and participants to respond to us will change the dynamic in this battle." In an effort to combat BDS, in March 2011, NGO Monitor produced "the BDS Sewer System" intended to provide detailed information about boycott campaigns against Israel.

Artists, actors, and writers

In 2008, former Beatles singer Paul McCartney decided to perform in Israel for the country's 60th anniversary despite a death threat from militant Islamic activist Omar Bakri Muhammad, who said, "If he values his life Mr McCartney must not come to Israel. He will not be safe there. The sacrifice operatives will be waiting for him." Omar Barghouti, one of the founders of the Palestinian Campaign for the Academic and Cultural Boycott of Israel, described the threat as "deplorable". McCartney said "I do what I think and I have many friends who support Israel."

In October 2010, the Cape Town Opera (CTO) declined an appeal by Desmond Tutu to cancel a tour of Israel. The CTO stated that the company was "reluctant to adopt the essentially political position of disengagement from cultural ties with Israel or with Palestine, and that they had been in negotiations for four years and would respect the contract.

Madonna's The MDNA Tour began in May 2012 in Tel Aviv, Israel. She said that the concert in Tel Aviv was a "peace concert", and offered about 600 tickets to the show to various Israeli and Palestinian groups, but this offer was rejected by Anarchists Against the Wall and the Sheikh Jarrah Solidarity group.  The offer was accepted by the Palestinian-Israeli Peace NGO Forum. Madonna's performance was criticized by Omar Barghouti.

In January 2014, Scarlett Johansson started to promote SodaStream, an Israeli company operating in Ma'ale Adumim, a West Bank settlement, which sparked criticism from Oxfam. In response, Johansson severed ties with Oxfam after eight years, saying she supports trade and "social interaction between a democratic Israel and Palestine" and she has "a fundamental difference of opinion with Oxfam in regards to the boycott, divestment and sanctions movement." Two years later, Oxfam CEO Mark Goldring lamented that losing Johansson over BDS was “something of a PR disaster” that had cost Oxfam “literally thousands” of donors.

In October 2015, J.K. Rowling was one of the 150 people from the British arts world who signed a letter against the call for a boycott of Israel that was made in February. The signatories of the letter said "cultural boycotts singling out Israel are divisive and discriminatory, and will not further peace. Open dialogue and interaction promote greater understanding and mutual acceptance, and it is through such understanding and acceptance that movement can be made towards a resolution of the conflict." Some of the signatories were closely aligned with Israel, for example via the Conservative Friends of Israel and Labour Friends of Israel.

Other artists who have voiced opposition to the campaign include writers Umberto Eco and film makers Joel and Ethan Coen. Novelist Ian McEwan, upon being awarded the Jerusalem Prize, was urged to turn it down, but said that "If I only went to countries that I approve of, I probably would never get out of bed.... It's not great if everyone stops talking." Many musicians such as Elton John, Leonard Cohen, Lady Gaga, Rihanna, Radiohead, Metallica, Editors, Placebo, LCD Soundsystem, MGMT, Justin Bieber, Ziggy Marley, Red Hot Chili Peppers, Mark Ronson, Depeche Mode, Gilberto Gil, Daniela Mercury, Rolling Stones, Alicia Keys, Tom Jones, Riverdance, PiL, Eric Burdon, and Bon Jovi have chosen to perform in Israel in recent years.
	
In October 2021, over 200 celebrities, including Mila Kunis, Billy Porter, Neil Patrick Harris, Helen Mirren, Lance Bass and Jeremy Piven, signed an open letter repudiating calls for a boycott of the Tel Aviv International LGBT Film Festival.

Public figures
In February 2012, Norman Finkelstein "launched a blistering attack" of the BDS movement during an interview, saying it was a "hypocritical, dishonest cult" that tries to cleverly pose as human rights activists while in reality their goal is to destroy Israel. In addition, he said: "I'm getting a little bit exasperated with what I think is a whole lot of nonsense. I'm not going to tolerate silliness, childishness and a lot of leftist posturing. I loathe the disingenuousness. We will never hear the solidarity movement [back a] two-state solution." Furthermore, Finkelstein stated that the BDS movement has had very few successes, and that just like a cult, the leaders pretend that they are hugely successful when in reality the general public rejects their extreme views. He does mention though that he supports the idea of a non-violent BDS movement.

Though Israeli chocolate company Max Brenner is targeted by some Australian Palestinian activists, the Australian Minister for Foreign Affairs and former Prime Minister Kevin Rudd said, "I don't think in 21st-century Australia there is a place for the attempted boycott of a Jewish business."

Senior figures in the Australian Labor Party linked action against the Australian Greens at a state conference, where the Greens were denied automatic preferences, to the Greens' previous support for the BDS movement. Former New South Wales treasurer and Australian Labor Party general secretary Eric Roozendaal and fellow Legislative Councillor Walt Secord, stated, "The Greens will carry forever the stain of their support for the BDS campaign and their attempts to delegitimise Israel and the Jewish community—and this is one of the reasons why we must stand strong against the Greens."

In April 2013, Prime Minister Julia Gillard said that the "campaign does not serve the cause of peace and diplomacy for agreement on a two-state solution between Israel and Palestine", and added that Australia has always had firm opposition to the BDS movement. Representing the Coalition prior to the 2013 federal election, Liberal Party deputy leader Julie Bishop reaffirmed Gillard's stance by promising to cut off federal grants for individuals and institutions who support the BDS campaign. On 29 May 2013, Jewish Australian academics Andrew Benjamin, Michele Grossman and David Goodman condemned the Coalition's election promise as "an anti-democratic gesture par excellence".

In February 2014, Israeli Ambassador to the UK Daniel Taub said in a CNN interview that proponents of a boycott on Israeli goods are making a "mistake" and sending a "problematic" message to Palestinian negotiators: "If they genuinely want to advance peace, what they're really doing is they're sending a double message ... They're sending a message to the Palestinian that [they] don't need to be sitting at the negotiating table."

Ed Husain, writing in The New York Times, says that the boycott of Israel should end, since it is hurting the Palestinians more than helping them. Husain believes that the "voice of the Palestinian imams who want to see an end to the boycott needs to be amplified", as well as those "religious leaders" in Egypt and in Saudi Arabia who "advocate peace".

Official and legal responses

See also

 Buycott
 Constructive engagement
 Criticism of Israel
 Israeli passport

References

Sources

External links

Legislative Agenda Opposing Boycott, Divestment and Sanctions , American Israel Public Affairs Committee
BDS Movement, Boycott, Divestment and Sanctions

Boycott, Divestment and Sanctions
 
Zionism
Human rights in Israel
Human rights in the State of Palestine